The 786th Air Expeditionary Squadron is a provisional unit of the United States Air Force, assigned to United States Air Forces in Europe (USAFE) to activate or inactivate as needed.   USAFE has activated the squadron for short periods of contingency operations.

The squadron was first organized in August 1943 as the 786th Bombardment Squadron, a heavy bomber unit.  After training in the United States with Consolidated B-24 Liberators, the 786th moved to England, where it participated in the strategic bombing campaign against Germany.  Following V-E Day, it returned to the United States, where it began training with Boeing B-29 Superfortresses, but was inactivated in October 1945.

The squadron was briefly active in 1965 as the 786th Tactical Fighter Squadron.  While it was training with McDonnell F-4 Phantom IIs, it was inactivated and its assets transferred to another squadron.

History

World War II

Training in the United States
The 786th Bombardment Squadron was activated at Alamogordo Army Air Field on 1 August 1943 as one of the four original squadrons of the 466th Bombardment Group.  After training there with Consolidated B-24 Liberators, the squadron departed for the European Theater of Operations in February 1944.  The ground echelon proceeded to the port of embarkation for transport to Europe by ship, while the air echelon ferried their Liberators via the South Atlantic Ferry route.

Combat in Europe

The squadron arrived at its combat station, RAF Attlebridge in England in March 1944.  It flew its first combat mission on 22 March in an attack on Berlin, Germany.  It engaged primarily in the strategic bombing campaign against Germany, with targets that included oil refineries and facilities at Bohlen and Misburg, marshalling yards at Liège and Saarbrücken, factories at Brunswick, Kempten and Eisenach, repair facilities at Reims, mining facilities near Hamburg and airfields at Saint-Trond and Chartres.

The squadron also flew air support and air interdiction missions.  It attacked pillboxes in Normandy on D-Day to support Operation Overlord and performed interdiction missions against targets beyond the beachhead in the following days.  During Operation Cobra, the breakout at Saint Lo in July, it bombed German positions in the city.  It attacked lines of communication during the Battle of the Bulge in December 1944 and January 1945.  On 24 March, it supported Operation Varsity, the airborne assault across the Rhine by attacking a military air base at Nordhorn.  The squadron's last mission of the war was flown on 25 April 1945 against electrical facilities at Traunstein.

Return to the United States and inactivation
Following V-E Day, the squadron returned to the United States. The squadron reassembled at Sioux Falls Army Air Field, South Dakota in late July 1945. In August, the squadron moved to Davis-Monthan Field, Arizona to begin training with the Boeing B-29 Superfortress. However with the surrender of Japan, the squadron was inactivated in October as Davis-Monthan transitioned from a training base to a storage facility.

Fighter operations

As the United States Air Force expanded its McDonnell F-4 Phantom II fleet in April 1965, it activated the 33d Tactical Fighter Wing at Eglin Air Force Base Florida.  Although it was planned that the squadrons of the 33d Wing would be Convair F-102 Delta Dagger squadrons that were inactivating in the Pacific, these squadrons were still winding down their operations, so the 33d was initially formed with the 786th, 787th, 788th and 789th Tactical Fighter Squadrons.  The 33d embarked on a program of tactical training with the Phantom.  In June 1965, the squadron was inactivated and its planes and personnel were transferred to the 4th Tactical Fighter Squadron, which moved on paper to Eglin from Misawa Air Base, Japan.

Expeditionary unit
In April 2006, the squadron was converted to provisional status and redesignated the 786th Air Expeditionary Squadron.  It was activated in May at Tuzla, Bosnia-Herzegovina, with a detachment at Baumholder, Germany.  It was activated again in September in Nigeria.

The squadron provided airlift into Darfur for the 55th Battalion of the Rwandan Army to join the United Nations African Union Mission in Darfur in 2007.

Its most recent activations have been for operations in Spain and Iceland.

Lineage
 Constituted as the 786th Bombardment Squadron (Heavy) on 19 May 1943
 Activated on 1 August 1943
 Redesignated 786th Bombardment Squadron, Heavy c. 10 August 1944
 Redesignated 786th Bombardment Squadron, Very Heavy on 5 August 1945
 Inactivated on 17 October 1945
 Redesignated 787th Tactical Fighter Squadron on 9 February 1965 and activated (not organized)
 Organized on 1 April 1965
 Inactivated on 20 June 1965
 Converted to provisional status and redesignated 786th Air Expeditionary Squadron on 24 April 2006
 Activated on 1 May 2006
 Inactivated 2006
 Activated on 3 September 2006
 Inactivated on 20 September 2006
 Activated on 2 April 2007
 Inactivated on 31 October 2007
 Activated on 5 May 2009
 Inactivated on 5 June 2009
 Activated on 1 May 2012
 Inactivated unknown

Assignments
 466th Bombardment Group, 1 August 1943 – 17 October 1945
 33d Tactical Fighter Wing, 1 April–20 June 1965
 Attached to Air Command, Europe, 1 May 2006 – 2006
 458th Air Expeditionary Group, 3–20 September 2006
 Attached to Third Air Force, 2 April–31 Oct 2007
 458th Air Expeditionary Group, 5 May–5 June 2009
 Attached to Third Air Force, 1 May 2012 – unknown

Stations
 Alamogordo Army Air Field, New Mexico, 1 August 1943
 Kearns Army Air Base, Utah 31 August 1943
 Alamogordo Army Air Field, New Mexico, 27 November 1943 - 10 February 1944
 RAF Attlebridge (AAF-120), England 8 March 1944 - c. 6 July 1945
 Sioux Falls Army Air Field, South Dakota, 15 July 1945 - 25 July 1945
 Pueblo Army Air Base, Colorado, 25 July 1945  - 15 August 1945
 Davis-Monthan Field, Arizona, 15 August-17 October 1945
 Eglin Air Force Base, Florida, 1 April–20 June 1965
 Tuzla, Bosnia-Herzegovina, 1 May 2006 – 2006
 Kaduna, Nigeria, 3–20 September 2006
 Kigali International Airport, Rwanda, 29 April–31 October 2007
 Moron Air Base, Spain, 5 May–5 June 2009
 Keflavik Naval Air Station, Iceland, 1 May 2012 – unknown

Aircraft
 Consolidated B-24 Liberator, 1943–1945
 Boeing B-29 Superfortress, 1945
 McDonnell F-4 Phantom II, 1965

Campaigns

See also

 List of F-4 Phantom II operators
 List of B-29 Superfortress operators
 B-24 Liberator units of the United States Army Air Forces

References

Notes
 Explanatory notes

 Citations

Bibliography

 
 
 
 
 

Air expeditionary squadrons of the United States Air Force